The following is a list of squads for each nation competing in men's football at the 2018 Asian Games in Jakarta. Each nation must submit a squad of 20 players, 17 of whom must be born on or after 1 January 1995, and three of whom can be older dispensation players.

Group A

Chinese Taipei
The following is the Chinese Taipei squad in the men's football tournament of the 2018 Asian Games. The team of 20 players was officially named on 7 August.

Head coach: Peng Wu-song

* Over-aged player.

Hong Kong
The following is the Hong Kong squad in the men's football tournament of the 2018 Asian Games.

Head coach: Kwok Kar Lok

* Over-aged player.

Indonesia
The following is Indonesia's 20-man squad for the men's football tournament of the 2018 Asian Games, officially named on 10 August.

Head coach:  Luis Milla

* Over-aged player.

Laos
The following is the Laos squad in the men's football tournament of the 2018 Asian Games. The team of 20 players was officially named on 7 August.

Head coach:  Mike Wong Mun Heng

* Over-aged player.

Palestine
The following is the Palestine squad in the men's football tournament of the 2018 Asian Games. The team of 20 players was officially named on 8 August.

Head coach: Ayman Sandouqa

* Over-aged player.

Group B

Bangladesh
The following is the Bangladesh squad in the men's football tournament of the 2018 Asian Games.

Head coach:  Jamie Day

* Over-aged player.

Qatar
The following is the Qatar squad in the men's football tournament of the 2018 Asian Games. The team of 20 players was officially named on 8 August.

Manager:  Unai Melgosa

* Over-aged player.

Thailand
The following is the Thailand squad in the men's football tournament of the 2018 Asian Games. The team of 20 players was officially named on 11 August.

Head coach:  Worrawoot Srimaka

* Over-aged player.

Uzbekistan
The following is the Uzbekistan squad in the men's football tournament of the 2018 Asian Games. The team of 20 players was officially named on 10 August.

Head coach:  Ravshan Khaydarov

* Over-aged player.

Group C

China PR
The following is the China squad in the men's football tournament of the 2018 Asian Games. The final squad was announced on 10 August.

Head coach:  Massimiliano Maddaloni

* Over-aged player.

Syria
The following is the Syria squad in the men's football tournament of the 2018 Asian Games.

Head coach: Muhannad Al Fakeer

* Over-aged player.

Timor-Leste
The following is the Timor-Leste squad in the men's football tournament of the 2018 Asian Games.

Head coach:  Norio Tsukitate

* Over-aged player.

United Arab Emirates
The following is the United Arab Emirates squad in the men's football tournament of the 2018 Asian Games. Mohammed Khalfan, who was originally in the squad announced earlier, was dropped from the squad as a result of indiscipline shown in the friendly match against Malaysia on 10 August 2018.

Head coach:  Maciej Skorża

* Over-aged player.

Group D

Japan
The following is the Japan squad in the men's football tournament of the 2018 Asian Games. The team of 20 players was officially named on 3 August.

Head coach:  Hajime Moriyasu

* Over-aged player.

Nepal
The following is the Nepal squad in the men's football tournament of the 2018 Asian Games. The team of 20 players was officially named on 24 June.

Head coach:  Koji Gyotoku

* Over-aged player.

Pakistan
The following is the Pakistan squad in the men's football tournament of the 2018 Asian Games. The team of 20 players was officially named on 10 August.

Head coach:  José Antonio Nogueira

* Over-aged player.

Vietnam
The following is the Vietnam squad in the men's football tournament of the 2018 Asian Games. The team of 20 players was officially named on 19 July.

Head coach:  Park Hang-seo

* Over-aged player.

Group E

Bahrain
The following is the Bahrain squad in the men's football tournament of the 2018 Asian Games.

Head coach:  Samir Chammam

* Over-aged player.

Kyrgyzstan
The following is the Kyrgyzstan squad in the men's football tournament of the 2018 Asian Games.

Head coach:  Igor Kudarenko

* Over-aged player.

Malaysia
The following is the Malaysia squad in the men's football tournament of the 2018 Asian Games. The team of 20 players was officially named on 12 August. Danial Amier Norhisham was replaced by Rodney Celvin on 13 August.

Head coach:  Ong Kim Swee

* Over-aged player.

South Korea
The following is the South Korea squad in the men's football tournament of the 2018 Asian Games. The team of 20 players was officially named on 16 July.

Head coach:  Kim Hak-bum

* Over-aged player.

Group F

Iran
The following is the Iran squad in the men's football tournament of the 2018 Asian Games. The team of 20 players was officially named on 31 July.

Head coach:  Zlatko Kranjčar

Myanmar
The following is the Myanmar squad in the men's football tournament of the 2018 Asian Games.

Head coach:  Antoine Hey

* Over-aged player.

North Korea
The following is the North Korea squad in the men's football tournament of the 2018 Asian Games.

Head coach: Ju Song-il

* Over-aged player.

Saudi Arabia
The following is the Saudi Arabia squad in the men's football tournament of the 2018 Asian Games.

Head coach:  Saad Al-Shehri

* Over-aged player.

See also
 Football at the 2018 Asian Games – Women's team squads

References

External links

Men
2018